Wigan Pier is an area around the Leeds and Liverpool Canal in Wigan, Greater Manchester, England, south-west of the town centre. The name has humorous or ironic connotations since it conjures an image of a seaside pleasure pier, whereas Wigan is inland and a traditionally industrial town.

History

The original "pier" at Wigan was a coal loading staithe, probably a wooden jetty, where wagons from a nearby colliery were unloaded into waiting barges on the canal. The original wooden pier is believed to have been demolished in 1929, with the iron from the tippler (a mechanism for tipping coal into the barges) being sold as scrap.

A telling of the origin of what really was 'Wigan Pier' goes that in 1891, an excursion train to Southport got delayed on the outskirts of Wigan not long after leaving Wallgate Station.  At that time a long wooden gantry or trestle carried a mineral line from Lamb and Moore's Newtown Colliery on Scot Lane, to their Meadows Colliery in Frog Lane (where the Council refuse centre is now).  This gantry was quite a structure, as it had to span the Douglas valley, crossing the river, the canal and the main rail line to Southport.  As the delayed train waited for the signals to change, one of the travellers remarked "where the b... hell are we?" and the reply became the basis for the immortal joke about Wigan's Pier.  George Formby, Sr. perpetuated the joke around the turn of the century in the music halls in Wigan, adding that when he passed the Pier he noticed the tide was in (referring to the constant flooding in the low-lying area). Formby died in February 1921, and with the demise of the collieries in the area, the gantry had long passed out of existence. Therefore when people looked for the Pier, the tippler for coal wagons at the canal terminus became the chosen object of the joke. The tippler became the favoured location when people subsequently wanted to see it. There are references to it in songs such as George Formby Junior's On the Wigan Boat Express. The Ballad of Wigan Pier, written by local journalist Jack Winstanley, is a comic song written in the 1980s in the style of George Formby Junior. It was recorded by The Houghton Weavers and was regularly performed by them. Its lyrics perpetuate the idea of Wigan having a pier in the style of seaside resorts like Blackpool, and encourage you to look for it. References also include a mythical visit by Her Majesty Queen Elizabeth II, fishing for tripe using locally produced sweets Uncle Joe's Mint Balls and refer also to George Formby Senior as the origin of its mythical existence.

In 1937, Wigan was featured in the title of George Orwell's The Road to Wigan Pier, which dealt in large part with the living conditions of England's working poor. In response to a critic, Orwell insisted "He [Orwell] liked Wigan very much—the people, not the scenery. Indeed, he has only one fault to find with it, and that is in respect of the celebrated Wigan Pier, which he had set his heart on seeing. Alas! Wigan Pier had been demolished, and even the spot where it used to stand is no longer certain." Some have embraced the Orwellian link, as it has provided the area with a modest tourist base over the years. "It seems funny to celebrate Orwell for highlighting all our bad points, but Wigan wouldn't be anywhere near as famous without him," said the Wigan Pier Experience's manager, Carole Tyldesley. "In the end George Orwell has proved to be a strong marketing tool." Others regard this connection as disappointing, considering it an insinuation that Wigan is no better now than it was at the time of Orwell's writing.

The canal scene from The Road to Wigan Pier describes the area as such: "I remember a winter afternoon in the dreadful environs of Wigan. All round was the lunar landscape of slag-heaps, and to the north, through the passes, as it were, between the mountains of slag, you could see the factory chimneys sending out their plumes of smoke. The canal path was a mixture of cinders and frozen mud, criss-crossed by the imprints of innumerable clogs, and all round, as far as the slag-heaps in the distance, stretched the 'flashes'—pools of stagnant water that had seeped into the hollows caused by the subsidence of ancient pits. It was horribly cold. The 'flashes' were covered with ice the colour of raw umber, the bargemen were muffled to the eyes in sacks, the lock gates wore beards of ice. It seemed a world from which vegetation had been banished; nothing existed except smoke, shale, ice, mud, ashes, and foul water."

Today, the slag heaps have been removed or landscaped with trees, the factories are closed or converted to housing, and the canal is only used for recreational boating and fishing.

Existing buildings
The pier was at the end of a narrow gauge tramway from a colliery. The wagons would be brought right to the edge of the canal to be tippled so that their contents went straight into the waiting barges. The original wooden pier is believed to have been demolished in 1929, with the iron from the tippler being sold as scrap. Because of the more recent pride in the area's heritage, a replica tippler, consisting of two curved rails, has been erected although several hundred metres from the original location.

The former Wigan Terminus Warehouses were built in the eighteenth century and refurbished in the 1980s.  Boats could moor inside the building and off-load directly into the warehouse.

A warehouse with covered loading bays, converted into a museum of Victorian life (often mistakenly thought to be Wigan Pier), and the home to The Way We Were museum, was part of the Wigan Pier Experience museum and exhibition centre.  The exhibition featured a Victorian school room, a colliery disaster, the Second Boer War and (on the top floor) a complete pub transported from Hope Street and reconstructed by shopping centre developers.  The Wigan Pier Theatre Company used these displays to remind present generations of "The Way We Were"—not always a happy life. The attraction closed on 20 December 2007.

Gibson's Warehouse is a Victorian cotton warehouse, originally built in 1777, re-built in 1984 as The Orwell at Wigan Pier, is situated on the canalside.

Number 1 Wigan Pier, won a Civic Trust Award—the architect being Michael Stroud Churchward when it refurbished in the early part of the 1980s.

Trencherfield Mill is a former cotton mill, located across the road from Wigan Pier converted into luxury apartments in 2009. It still contains the massive working steam engine which was kept in the new development.

There are several bridges across the canal. Bridge #51 Pottery Changeline is a roving bridge, one which swaps the tow path from one side of the canal to the other, usually in such a way as to allow the horse pulling the barge to pass easily and without disconnecting its tow-rope. Bridge #50 Seven Stars Bridge is adjacent to the Seven Stars public house (now demolished), taking its name from The Plough constellation.

Elizabeth House, whose address is The Pier, Wigan, houses Keep Britain Tidy, an environmental charity.

Wigan Pier Nightspot was a night club on the southern bank of the Canal. The club played music predominantly of the Scouse House/Bounce genre until it closed in December 2011.

Future

A planning application proposing the overhaul of the famous Wigan Pier to provide new homes, an artisan food hall and events spaces have been approved.

References

External links
Wigan Pier for tourists and visitors
Recent images from around Wigan Pier
Historic images from around Wigan Pier
Wigan Council

Buildings and structures demolished in 1929
Tourist attractions in the Metropolitan Borough of Wigan
Buildings and structures in Wigan
Textile museums in the United Kingdom
Piers in England
Recipients of Civic Trust Awards
Wharves in the United Kingdom